The LA Pride Festival & Parade, commonly known as LA Pride, is an annual LGBTQ Pride celebration in Los Angeles, California. It is one of the largest LGBTQ Pride events in the world, traditionally held on the second weekend of June, and produced by the Christopher Street West Association.

Christopher Street West Association Inc. 
Christopher Street West Association (CSW) was established in 1970 by co-founders Rev. Troy Perry (founder, Metropolitan Community Church), Rev. Bob Humphries (founder, United States Mission), and Morris Kight (founder, Gay Liberation Front) to organize a gay parade in Los Angeles to commemorate the Stonewall Riots in New York City, the year prior. Its eponymous name is an homage to The Stonewall Inn's address on Christopher Street in Greenwich Village.

CSW remained an ad hoc organization run by an all-volunteer board of directors until 1976, when it incorporated and was granted 501(c)3 nonprofit status by the Internal Revenue Service. CSW is still run by an all-volunteer board of directors.

CSW states its mission is to "create safe and inclusive spaces of self-expression, celebration, and diversity/equity/inclusion for the LGBTQ+ community of Greater Los Angeles."

While best known for producing the LA Pride Festival & Parade™, CSW also "organizes, sponsors or supports other community events throughout the year, and works with nonprofit, philanthropic, community and corporate partners to further diversity, equity and inclusion."

LA Pride Festival & Parade

The first permitted gay parade in the world 
CSW co-founders Rev. Troy Perry, Rev. Bob Humphries, and Morris Kight originally discussed organizing a march or a demonstration, but Troy Perry famously said, "No. We’re going to do a parade. This is Hollywood."

According to Rev. Perry, "The Police Commission voted 4 to 1 to place conditions on the parade permit. And they were, 1) you'd have to put up a bond for a million dollars to pay out the businesses when people throw rocks at ya'll 2) you have to put up a cash bond of $500,000, and 3) you've got to have at least 5000 people marching."

The ACLU joined CSW in their legal challenge of the LAPD's excessive fees, and restrictions that other parade permits were not required to follow . The California Superior Court ruled in favor of CSW and ordered the Police Commission to issue a parade permit to CSW for a $1,500 security payment, and furthermore, that all other requirements be dropped.

On June 28, 1970, approximately 2,000 people gathered on McCadden Place in Los Angeles, marched north to Hollywood Blvd, and proceeded east towards Vine Street. CSW's "Gay Pride Parade" became the first permitted gay parade in the world.

LA Pride evolution and relocation 
In 1974, CSW board member and pioneering gay filmmaker, Pat Rocco, pitched the idea adding a festival to accompany the parade. The first festival was a carnival with rides, games, food, and vendor booths in a Hollywood parking lot. Continuing hostility and harassment from the Los Angeles Police Department led CSW to relocate the parade and festival in 1979 to a more welcoming unincorporated LA neighborhood around Santa Monica Blvd. In 1984, that area became part of the newly incorporated City of West Hollywood. Thus, LA Pride actually predates West Hollywood by five years.

Eventually, CSW trademarked the annual event as the LA Pride Festival & Parade™ and expanded the event to include a three-day celebration with music performances and other Pride events in and around Los Angeles during the entire month of June, Pride month. By the early 2000's, attendance of LA Pride weekend was estimated to be 400,000-500,000, making it one of the largest Pride celebrations in the United States, and the world. Recent LA Prides have included:

LA Pride 2015
In 2015 LA Pride was held on June 12 to June 14, 2015. The headlining artists for the festival were Wilson Phillips, Tinashe, Ty Herndon, Eden xo, and Fifth Harmony.

LA Pride 2016
In 2016 LA Pride was held on June 10–12, 2016. Among the 35 artists scheduled to perform were Big Freedia, Charli XCX, Da Brat, Daya, Faith Evans, Carly Rae Jepsen, Lion Babe, Robin S., Hailee Steinfeld, and Trina. The Saturday night before the parade, Santa Monica police arrested a man who had explosives, assault rifles and ammunition, and was planning to attend the LA Pride festival parade, said Los Angeles Mayor Eric Garcetti during a press conference Sunday morning.  The 22-year-old suspect was arrested hours after the massacre at Pulse nightclub in Orlando on June 12, 2016. It was unknown if the incidents were connected, the Los Angeles arrest was a copycat crime, or the two were unrelated.

LA Pride 2017
In 2017 LA Pride replaced its traditional parade festivities with a resistance approach forming a #ResistMarch and incorporating the social media hashtag #OwnYourPride. The march kicked off at the original start of its 1970 parade in Hollywood on Hollywood Blvd.  This attracted controversy in parts of the LGBT community as it was stated to be a Trump resistance march. Notable speakers at the #ResistMarch were: Maxine Waters, Margaret Cho, Chris Rock, America Ferrera, Adam Lambert, and Nancy Pelosi. The parade grand marshal was Alexei Romanoff, LGBT and AIDS activist, and one of the leaders of The Black Cat demonstrations in 1967, two years before the Stonewall Riot.

LA Pride 2018 
In 2018, LA Pride was held on June 9–10, 2018. The musical performances included appearance by R&B artist Kehlani and international pop singer Tove Lo The first day of LA Pride’s two-day annual Festival sold out for the first time ever in its 48-year history. The festival reached capacity by early evening. Due to the higher than expected turn out, some people who purchased tickets for Saturday were not able to enter the festival grounds.

LA Pride 2019 
In 2019, LA Pride expanded its footprint on Santa Monica Boulevard with “Pride on the Boulevard,” a free block party that allowed attendees to gather and watch local performers on both Saturday, June 8 and Sunday, June 9, and included new attractions like a Ferris wheel and a free show starring music and dance icon, Paula Abdul. Also that year, CSW signed a three-year agreement with ABC7 Los Angeles (KABC) to televise the LA Pride Parade. Raven’s Home star and out lesbian, Raven-Symone, was tapped to co-host the two-hour live broadcast with KABC anchors Ellen Leyva and Brandi Hitt. Festival headliners included Meghan Trainor, Years & Years, Greyson Chance, Ashanti and The Veronicas, with numerous local artists, up-and-coming performers.

CSW commissioned an economic impact study for 2019 and found that LA Pride generated $2.5 million in tax revenue for Los Angeles County, and increased labor income for workers by $14.7 million in West Hollywood, and $7.4 million in Los Angeles.  Additional findings showed that LA Pride 2019:

 Increased economic output in Los Angeles County by $74.7 million of which $27.7 million was concentrated in West Hollywood and $18.2 million in the City of Los Angeles 
 Supported the annual equivalent of 830 jobs in LA County, including 397 in West Hollywood and 191 in the City of Los Angeles 
 Estimated $896,100 in tax revenue generated in West Hollywood, and $332,800 in the City of Los Angeles

LA Pride 2020: Anniversary and cancelation due to COVID-19
CSW was set to celebrate its 50th anniversary with LA Pride 2020. On March 12, 2020, CSW joined a growing number of event organizers and city officials, and announced it was cancelling all in-person events due to the COVID-19 pandemic. CSW pivoted to a "virtual parade" program and worked with its media partner, KABC, to produce the LA Pride 50th Anniversary Celebration television show, which aired June 27 at 8:00PM.

LA Pride 2021 
Due to the continuation of social distancing guidelines and in-person gathering restrictions, CSW announced in spring 2021 that it would produce another virtual Pride celebration, and reserve the option to add in-person events if pandemic conditions improved.  LA Pride 2021 included a free streaming concert presented by TikTok headlined by LA Pride alumni Charli XCX, a Thrive with Pride Celebration one-hour television special on ABC7, and "Pride Makes a Difference," a new, month-long calendar of events focused on volunteering and community service around Los Angeles. By mid-May, CSW had added two in-person events, LGBTQ+ Night at Dodger Stadium, and a charity partnership with Cinespia, the outdoor film event producers at the Hollywood Forever Cemetery. The last in-person event to be added was "Pride is Universal," the after-hours theme park party at Universal Studios Hollywood™

CSW and LA Pride are now integral to LGBTQ+ history in California and the nation. CSW has a permanent collection of documents, photographs and archival Pride posters, images and media at ONE Archive, the National Gay and Lesbian Archives at the University of Southern California Libraries.

LA Pride 2022 
The celebrations returned to its origins for the first time in 40 years, the parade returned to Hollywood Boulevard.

Parade grand marshals

|2022
|[Paula Abdul]

Philanthropy

USC Scholarship 
In 1990, Christopher Street West in conjunction with the Gay and Lesbian Assembly for Student Services (GLASS) established an endowment at the University of Southern California with the purpose of funding scholarships for students pursuing degrees, and research for the improvement of the LGBTQ condition.

Casa del Sol 
Casa del Sol is property located in Hollywood that CSW purchased in 1988. CSW entered into a joint project with AIDS Project Los Angeles (APLA) to provide low-income housing and support services to people living with HIV/AIDS. This arrangement set a precedent for other independent living programs for persons with HIV/AIDS, and has operating continuously for over 30 years.

Supporting the LGBTQ community of Los Angeles and beyond 
CSW sponsors or supports other events and community groups throughout the year. Past beneficiaries have included Long Beach Trans Pride, Jolene's Night, benefitting trans artists financially impacted by COVID  and Rainbowland Ball.

References

External links

 
 Image of bikers in Gay Pride Parade in West Hollywood, California, 1986. Los Angeles Times Photographic Archive (Collection 1429). UCLA Library Special Collections, Charles E. Young Research Library, University of California, Los Angeles.

Annual events in Los Angeles County, California
Festivals in Los Angeles
LGBT culture in Los Angeles
LGBT events in California
Pride parades in California
West Hollywood, California